The 2021–22 season has been the 12th season in the existence of the basketball club KK Slodes, and historical as it was first season for the club in Basketball League of Serbia.

Overview

After very successful season, finishing 2nd in Second Basketball League of Serbia, Slodes has got promoted to Basketball League of Serbia for the first time in club's history.

Off-season
Club's legend Nenad Mišanović decided to retire from basketball and become general manager of the club.

Petar Perković (to Rivers BM), Mihailo Krtolina (to Joker), Luka Sofijanić (to Borac Zemun), Petar Dilparić and Vukota Veličković (to Žarkovo) left the club in off-season.

Assistant coach, Dean Medan has left Slodes to join Darko Russo at Astana.

Pre-season
In summer 2020, the team started preparing for the Basketball League of Serbia's debut season by extending contracts with crucial players from last season: Uroš Ilić, Mateja Strinić, Branislav Sužnjev and captain Nikola Hristov. Also, adding Matija Radović, center Mihailo Todorović and duo from Dunav- Miloš Antić and Andrija Nešović to the roster.

Crvena zvezda sent Lazar Vasić, Nikola Manojlović and Filip Anđušić on loan to Slodes. Club promoted Marko Đorđević, Strahinja Knežević, Miloš Ilić and Luka Dimitrijević from youth academy to senior squad and landed Milan Nikolić.

On August 19, team played their first friendly game against ABA League team FMP and lost, 83–63. Three days later, Slodes beat OKK Beograd away in Radivoj Korac Hall by 100-102 and recorded its first victory in the preparations for the new season.

On August 31, club announcements changing its name to Slodes Soccerbet due to sponsorship reasons.

Slodes has continued preparations for the upcoming season by playing friendly matches against Dynamic, Kolubara LA 2003, Tamiš and Žitko Basket.
Club was supposed to be part of tournament in Smederevska Palanka along with Tamiš, Klik and host Mladost SP but tournament was cancelled due to COVID-19 pandemic.

October
On 2 October, Slodes Soccerbet debuted in Basketball League of Serbia against OKK Beograd and lost in a close match 80–76.

On 9 October, Club played first Basketball League of Serbia home game in Slodes Hall against Vojvodina.

On 10 October, Ivan Pavićević has left club and transferred to Benfica.

Match against Dynamic was live broadcast on  Arena Sport TV.

On 23 October, Slodes Soccerbet recorded their first win of the 2021–22 Basketball League of Serbia season by beating Tamiš at home.

Power forward, Uroš Ilić left club for Promo Donji Vakuf.

November
On 6 November, Slodes Soccerbet recorded their first away victory by beating Dunav after overtime in Park Hall in Stara Pazova.

Milan Nikolić left club for Czech Olomucko.

On 20 November, team managed to comeback after 20 point deficit after first half but unfortunately lost to Kolubara LA 2003 79:78.

On 22 November, Slodes Soccerbet  lost to Žitko Basket in Cup of Serbia.

December
On 15 December, head coach Marko Boras, assistant coach Miloš Šakota, condition coach Aleksa Russo and 5 players have left the club including captain Hristov. Slodes U17 coach Nenad Karanović was appointed as interim coach until club find new head coach.

After previous captain Nikola Hristov left club, Vuk Karadžić was appointed as new team captain.

Karanović led team in matches against Radnički Kragujevac and OKK Belgrade, where he gave chances to young players Luka Dimitrijević and Miloš Ilić due to huge problems with the roster.

On 22 December, Soccerbet ended cooperation with club. Club continued with old name - Slodes.

On 28 December, Igor Polenek was appointed as new head coach.

Crvena zvezda recalled Nikola Manojlović from Slodes and sent him on loan to FMP.

January
New head coach, Igor Polenek brought Stefan Miljenović, Dušan Hukić and Bogdan Riznić to the club with him.

U17 squad captain Aleksa Anufrijev was promoted to senior squad for match against Tamiš.

February
Members of U17 squad, Petar Radojković and Uroš Janjić were promoted to senior squad for the match against Dynamic.

March
On 17 March, Marko Đorđević terminated his contract with the club.

April
After match against Mladost Zemun, Igor Polenek got fired and Nenad Karanović was returned as head coach.

Club finished season with score of 2 wins and 28 loses and got relegated to Second Basketball League of Serbia.

Roster

Players with multiple nationalities
   Andrija Nešović

Roster changes

In

|}

Out

|}

Coaching changes

Pre-season and friendlies

Basketball League of Serbia

Standings

Matches

Cup of Serbia

References

Slodes